Shell Lake Municipal Airport  is a city owned public use airport located one nautical mile (2 km) southeast of the central business district of Shell Lake, a city in Washburn County, Wisconsin, United States. It is included in the Federal Aviation Administration (FAA) National Plan of Integrated Airport Systems for 2021–2025, in which it is categorized as a basic general aviation facility.

Although most U.S. airports use the same three-letter location identifier for the FAA and IATA, this airport is assigned SSQ by the FAA but has no designation from the IATA (which assigned SSQ to La Sarre Airport in La Sarre, Quebec, Canada). The airport's ICAO identifier is KSSQ.

Facilities and aircraft 
Shell Lake Municipal Airport covers an area of 132 acres (53 ha) at an elevation of 1,233 feet (376 m) above mean sea level. It has one runway designated 14/32 with an asphalt surface measuring 3,711 by 75 feet (1,131 x 23 m), with approved GPS approaches.

For the 12-month period ending September 23, 2021, the airport had 12,600 aircraft operations, an average of 35 per day: 95% general aviation, 4% air taxi and 1% military. In January 2023, there were 10 aircraft based at this airport: all 10 single-engine.

See also 
 List of airports in Wisconsin

References

External links 
  at Wisconsin DOT Airport Directory
 

Airports in Wisconsin
Buildings and structures in Washburn County, Wisconsin